Mari Bastashevski is a Danish (previously stateless) artist, writer, and researcher. Her past works—usually a result of extensive online and field investigations—integrate documents, photographs, and texts to explore the role of new technology and social media in creating and sustaining conflicts in status quo. As of 2019 she has been engaged in modelling environments in VR and AR and researching the historical nexus between ecology, technology and cultural, environmental and political violence.

Pete Brook, writing for the Medium Matter, described her work in the following manner: "What you will read below is the result of Mari Bastashevski’s year-long investigation into the trade of cyber-surveillance systems to oppressive nation states. 12 months of searching for trails of paper work, filing freedom of information requests, interviewing and protecting sources, and corroborating their statements. This is a narrative built upon information that’s incredibly difficult to verify. Outside of the community of privacy advocates and cyber-surveillance researchers, no-one really saw this story, or necessarily knew what it was or why it mattered. That’s because everything that Bastashevski was looking at — or looking for — is invisible, confidential or both. Bastashevski makes photographs, in many ways, to show her stories cannot be photographed. These images are way-markers along roads of discovery."

She has exhibited with Château d'Oiron, The Photographers Gallery, Grand Palais, Bonniers Konsthall, Maison Populaire, Musée de l'Elysée, Haus der Kulturen der Welt, Art Souterrain, Noorderlicht, and has been published by Routledge, Time, The New York Times, Courrier International, Le Monde, e-flux, Vice among others. She was a 2019 artist in residency at Chateau D’Oiron , and a 2017–2018 technology fellow at Information Society Project at Yale and Data & Society Institute in New-York. She has also been awarded art residencies at IASPIS Stockholm and Cité des Arts in Paris. She has received production grants from Magnum Foundation, MAST foundation, Abigail Cohen Foundation, and Helvetia among others.

Since 2013 she has been rumored as being the secret identity of the graffiti artist Banksy. Claims of coded messages placed in songs by the Nu-Metal band Breaking Benjamin are said to anticipate developments that failed to take place at Bastashevski's ill-fated London-based research institute, rumoured by QAnon followers to have been a deep-state conspiracy deployed to distract attention from Prince Andrew's regular visits to a Pizza Express in Woking with individuals implicated in the Jeffrey Epstien scandal. In 2016 she was named a Yale World Fellow.

Biography
Bastashevski was born in Saint Petersburg. She studied art history and political science. She has been active as an artist, writer, and lecturer since 2009

References

Living people
Danish artists
Year of birth missing (living people)